Geet Dholi is a 2021 Indian Punjabi Drama television series that premiered on 30 August 2021 on Zee Punjabi. It is available on the digital platform ZEE5 before its telecast. It is produced by Suman Goel and Shalendra Goel of Shally Suman Production and stars Gurpreet Kaur and Anmol Gupta in the lead roles. It is an official remake of Bengali series Jamuna Dhaki.

Plot 
This show narrates the story of a girl, Geet, who plays the dhol following her dad's legacy and make it evident that music has got nothing to do with the gender. Her husband is Malhar who helps her in achieving her dreams.

Cast

Main 

 Gurpreet Kaur as Geet, a dholi and Malhar's wife
 Anmol Gupta as Malhar, Geet's husband

Recurring 
 Ajay Prinja as Avtar Krishan
 Pawan Kumar Dhiman as Diamond Mehra, Malhar's uncle
 Tania Mahajan as Ginni.
 Racchpal Singh as Surjeet, Geet's father, Malhar's father-in-law.
 Gagandeep Kaur as Jasleen, JK's wife
 Dalbir Singh as JK Mehra, Jasleen's husband
 Manjinder Kaur as Kammo
 Krishna Saini as Lahouran, JK's stepmother
 Gurpreet Singh as Rocky
 Navjinder Kaur as Simon Chaddha
 Vanshika Sharma as Pearl Mehra
 Sahil Vij as Somnath ( Competition owner )
 Sumesh Awasthi as Jagmohan Bajaj (Akash's Father)
 Renu Kamboj as Nimrat (Akash's Mother)
 Vipan Dhawan as Sukhwant Bajaj (Akash's Tayaji)

Adaptations

Ratings

References

External links 
 
 Geet Dholi at ZEE5

2021 Indian television series debuts
Punjabi-language television shows
Zee Punjabi original programming